Hypostomus longiradiatus is a species of catfish in the family Loricariidae. It is native to South America, where it occurs in the Guamá River basin in Brazil. The species reaches  in total length and is believed to be a facultative air-breather.

References 

longiradiatus